This is a list of historic houses or notable homesteads located in Australia. The list has been sourced from a variety of national, state and local historical sources including those listed on the Australian Heritage Database, on the various heritage registers of the States and territories of Australia, or by the National Trust of Australia.

Australian Capital Territory

New South Wales

Northern Territory

Queensland 

 Note to be confused with Gowrie House, located in East Toowoomba.

South Australia

Tasmania

Victoria

Western Australia

See also

 Heritage Gardens in Australia

References

Index sources

Statistics
 Reference Source books=10; 
 Homesteads listed (gross)=366
 Total entries after duplications and elimination=312
Query: How many of these homesteads are NOT on a State or Federal Heritage Register?

External links
 Country Estates Index
 Index of Country Homesteads

Homesteads

Homesteads
Homesteads
Australia history-related lists